The 1962 UC Riverside Highlanders football team represented the University of California, Riverside as an independent during the 1962 NCAA College Division football season. Led by fourth-year head coach Jim Whitley, UC Riverside compiled a record of 3–5. The team was outscored by its opponents 187 to 120 for the season. The Highlanders played home games at UCR Athletic Field in Riverside, California.

Schedule

Notes

References

UC Riverside
UC Riverside Highlanders football seasons
UC Riverside Highlanders football